Kaji Balbhadra Shah (Nepali: बलभद्र शाह) was a commander of the Nepali troops during the Sino-Nepalese War in 1788. He was the leader of the attack from Kerung Axis in 1788. His subordinates were Kaji Kirtiman Singh Basnyat, Sardar Amar Singh Thapa and Kapardar Bhotu Pande. There were 6000 troops and 3200 porters employed.

References

Year of birth missing
Year of death missing
Nepalese military personnel
Nepalese generals